Campbell, Alberta may refer to:

Campbell, Newell County, Alberta, a locality in Newell County, Alberta
Campbell, Edmonton, a locality in Edmonton, Alberta